Karl-Heinz Scherzinger (18 May 1944 – 16 January 1993) was a German cross-country skier. He competed in the men's 30 kilometre event at the 1968 Winter Olympics.

References

External links
 

1944 births
1993 deaths
German male cross-country skiers
Olympic cross-country skiers of West Germany
Cross-country skiers at the 1968 Winter Olympics
People from Stade (district)
Sportspeople from Lower Saxony
20th-century German people